Adam Brown (born 1985) is a Republican member of the Illinois House of Representatives, representing the 101st district.

Brown is a graduate of the University of Illinois at Urbana–Champaign (2007). He worked for the United States Department of Agriculture and served on the Decatur, Illinois city council before his election to the Illinois House in 2010.

In 2011, Brown joined with State Representative Bill Mitchell of the 87th district in proposing statehood for Cook County. Mitchell said that Chicago is "dictating its views" to the rest of the state and Brown added that Chicago "overshadows" the rest of Illinois.

In September 2015, Brown announced he was retiring from the Illinois House of Representatives.

References

External links
Representative Adam Brown (R) 102nd District at the Illinois General Assembly
By session: 98th, 97th
Adam Brown for State Representative
 

1985 births
Living people
University of Illinois Urbana-Champaign alumni
Illinois Republicans
21st-century American politicians